Wolfgang Lutz (born 10 December 1956) is an Austrian demographer specializing in demographic analysis and population projection. He founded the Wittgenstein Centre for Demography and Global Human Capital in 2010 – a collaboration between IIASA (International Institute for Applied Systems Analysis), the Vienna Institute of Demography (VID) of the Austrian Academy of Sciences, and the WU-Vienna University of Economics and Business. In October 1985 he joined IIASA to lead the World Population Program. He has been director of VID since 2002 as well as a full professor of applied statistics (part-time) at Vienna University since 2008. He also holds the position of professorial research fellow at the Oxford Martin School for 21st Century Studies.

Biography

Lutz holds a Ph.D. in demography from the University of Pennsylvania (1983) and a second doctorate in statistics from the University of Vienna.

Lutz has worked on family demography, fertility analysis, and population projection as well as the interaction between population and the environment. He has authored a series of world population projections produced at IIASA and developed approaches for projecting education and human capital. Lutz is also the principal investigator of the Asian MetaCentre for Population and Sustainable Development Analysis and a professorial affiliate research fellow at the Oxford Institute of Population Ageing. Lutz is author and editor of 28 books and more than 200 refereed articles, including seven in  Science and Nature. In 2008, 2012 and again in 2016, he received an ERC Advanced Grant, in 2009 the Mattei Dogan Award of the IUSSP, in 2010 the Wittgenstein Award, (often referred to as "Austria's Nobel Prize") and in 2016 the Mindel C. Sheps Award of the Population Association of America. In 2016 he was elected as a foreign associate of the National Academy of Sciences.

On the occasion of Lutz's 60th birthday, the Wittgenstein Centre organized a festschrift-type conference on Variations on the [research] Themes of Wolfgang Lutz.

Selected publications

Notes

External links
 Wittgenstein Centre for Demography and Global Human Capital
 World Population Program at the International Institute for Applied Systems Analysis
 Vienna Institute of Demography

1950 births
Living people
University of Pennsylvania alumni
University of Vienna alumni
Austrian statisticians
Foreign associates of the National Academy of Sciences
European Research Council grantees